The US Embassy in Djibouti City is diplomatic mission of the United States to Djibouti.

Leadership

Ambassador is in charge of the Embassy. Jonathan Goodale Pratt is the current Ambassador of the United States to Djibouti.

History
The embassy in Djibouti was established June 27, 1977, with Walter S. Clarke as Chargé d'Affaires ad interim pending the appointment of an ambassador. The first ambassador, Jerrold M. North, was appointed on September 26, 1980.

In April 1977, the United States established a consulate general in Djibouti and, upon independence in June 1977, raised the status of its mission to an embassy. The first U.S. ambassador to the Republic of Djibouti arrived in October 1980. Over the past decade, the United States has been a principal provider of humanitarian assistance for famine relief and has sponsored health care, education, good governance and security assistance programs.

See also

List of diplomatic missions of the United States
Djibouti–United States relations

References

Official website

 Official website

Diplomatic missions of the United States
Diplomatic missions in Djibouti
Djibouti–United States relations